Axel Leonard Melander was an American entomologist specialising in Diptera and Hymenoptera.
His collection is shared between the German Entomological Institute and the National Museum of Natural History.

Educational career
His master's thesis was titled, "A monograph of the Empididæ of North America." He was a professor at Washington State University and retired as the chairman of the biology department of the City College of New York in 1943 after joining the faculty there on his graduation from Harvard in 1914.

References

1878 births
1962 deaths
American entomologists
City College of New York faculty
Dipterists
Harvard University alumni
Hymenopterists
University of Texas at Austin alumni
Washington State University faculty